Rassvet is a rural locality in Vablinsky Selsoviet Rural Settlement, Konyshyovsky District, Kursk Oblast, Russia. Population:

Geography 
The village is located in the Vablya River basin (a tributary of the Prutishche in the basin of the Seym), 71.5 km from the Russia–Ukraine border, 59 km north-west of Kursk, 18 km north-west of the district center – the urban-type settlement Konyshyovka, 3.5 km from the selsoviet center – Vablya.

 Climate
Rassvet has a warm-summer humid continental climate (Dfb in the Köppen climate classification).

Transport 
Rassvet is located 29.5 km from the federal route  Crimea Highway, 10.5 km from the road of regional importance  (Fatezh – Dmitriyev), 0.5 km from the road  (Konyshyovka – Zhigayevo – 38K-038), 3 km from the road of intermunicipal significance  (38K-005 – Ryzhkovo – Lukyanchikovo), 11.5 km from the nearest railway station Sokovninka (railway line Navlya – Lgov-Kiyevsky).

The rural locality is situated 64 km from Kursk Vostochny Airport, 167 km from Belgorod International Airport and 262 km from Voronezh Peter the Great Airport.

References

Notes

Sources

Rural localities in Konyshyovsky District
Dmitriyevsky Uyezd